The 1988–89 1. Slovenská národná hokejová liga season was the 20th season of the 1. Slovenská národná hokejová liga, the second level of ice hockey in Czechoslovakia alongside the 1. Česká národní hokejová liga. 12 teams participated in the league, and Partizán Liptovský Mikuláš won the championship. ZŤS Martin and ZVL Skalica were relegated.

Regular season

References

External links
 Season on avlh.sweb.cz (PDF)

Czech
1st. Slovak National Hockey League seasons
2